The following is a list of events relating to television in Ireland from 1961.

Events

 5 September – Telefís Éireann began transmission of test pictures.
 December – The first issue of RTV Guide, RTÉ's original programme journal, was published.
 31 December – Launch of Telefís Éireann. Its opening night included an address by President Éamon de Valera, and the first news bulletin read by Charles Mitchel.

Debuts

RTÉ
31 December – RTÉ News: Nine O'Clock (1961–present)

Ulster Television
2 October – Password (1961–1975)

See also
1961 in Ireland

References

 
1960s in Irish television